Préveranges is a commune in the Cher department in the Centre-Val de Loire region of France.

Geography
The commune is bordered to the south by the river Arnon. The commune borders both the departments of Allier and Creuse and is the highest point in the Cher department.

Population

Sights
 The church of St. Martin, dating from the thirteenth century.
 The fifteenth-century chateau at La Preugne.
 The tower of a thirteenth-century castle in the woods.
 A nineteenth-century house.
 A watermill at Marcoh.

International relations
The commune is twinned with:
 Préverenges, Switzerland

See also
Communes of the Cher department

References

External links

Official website of the commune of Préveranges 
Annuaire Mairie website 

Communes of Cher (department)